Christoph Wolff (born 24 May 1940) is a German musicologist. He is best known for his works on the music, life, and period of Johann Sebastian Bach. Christoph Wolff is an emeritus professor of Harvard University, and was part of the faculty since 1976, and former director of the Bach Archive in Leipzig from 2001 to 2014.

Life and career
He was born in Solingen, the son of theologian Hans Walter Wolff. He studied organ and historical keyboard instruments, musicology, and art history at the Universities of Berlin, Erlangen, and the Music Academy of Freiburg, receiving a performance diploma in 1963 and a PhD in 1966. Wolff taught music history at Erlangen, Toronto, Princeton, and Columbia Universities before joining the Harvard faculty in 1976 as Professor of Music and retiring in 2014. He was also on the graduate faculty of the Juilliard School from 2010–2018. A member of the American Academy of Arts and Sciences, the American Philosophical Society, the Saxon Academy of Sciences, the Akademie für Mozart-Forschung (he chaired it from 1996–2006) and since 2015 a member of the Order Pour le Mérite for Sciences and the Arts, he also holds an honorary professorship at the University of Freiburg, Germany.

Publications and media
His books include Bach: Essays on His Life and Music (Cambridge, 1991), Mozart's Requiem (Berkeley, 1994), The New Bach Reader (New York, 1998), Johann Sebastian Bach: The Learned Musician, which was a finalist for the Pulitzer Prize in 2001 (New York, 2000), and Bach's Musical Universe: The Composer and His Work (W.W. Norton, 2020). In 2013, his Mozart at the Gateway to His Fortune won an ASCAP-Deems Taylor Award. Wolff was interviewed about Bach's The Art of Fugue in the documentary film Desert Fugue.

Awards and recognition
He was awarded the IRC Harrison Medal of the Society for Musicology in Ireland in 2004 and the Royal Academy of Music/Kohn Foundation Bach Prize in 2006. Also he was awarded the Dent Medal of the International Musicological Society in 1978, the Humboldt Research Prize in 1996, the Otto Kinkeldey Award of the American Musicological Society in 2000 for Johann Sebastian Bach; the Learned Musician.

References

External links 
 Home page at Harvard University
 Harvard at Home: online lectures by Christoph Wolff
 Home page of the Bach Archive in Leipzig
 Bach & Friends documentary

1940 births
21st-century conductors (music)
American musicologists
Bach musicians
Bach scholars
Columbia University faculty
German emigrants to the United States
German musicologists
Harvard University faculty
Hochschule für Musik Freiburg alumni
Knights Commander of the Order of Merit of the Federal Republic of Germany
Living people
People from Belmont, Massachusetts
People from Solingen
Princeton University faculty
Recipients of the Pour le Mérite (civil class)
Winners of the Royal Academy of Music/ Kohn Foundation Bach Prize